The Histri were an ancient people inhabiting the Istrian Peninsula, to which they gave the name. Their territory stretched to the neighbouring Gulf of Trieste and bordered the Iapydes in the hinterland of Tarsatica. The Histri formed a kingdom.

Description 

The tribe is classified in some sources as a "Venetic" tribe, with some ties with Illyrians. It was also described as Thracians by others. Since they inhabited the Istrian peninsula, these people had more intensive trade and cultural contacts with the Mediterranean world, particularly central and southern Italy.

The Romans described the Histri as a fierce tribe of pirates, protected by the difficult navigation of their rocky coasts. An account stated that this tribe was first in the northern Adriatic area to be threatened by the Roman imperialism and to start a war. It took two military campaigns for the Romans to finally subdue them in 177 BCE. The region was then called, together with the Venetian part, the X. Roman region of "Venetia et Histria", the ancient definition of the northeastern border of Italy. Dante Alighieri refers to it as well; the eastern border of Italy per ancient definition is the river Arsia.

See also 
Nesactium

References

Citations

Bibliography 

Ancient tribes in Croatia
History of Istria
Tribes conquered by Rome
Ancient peoples